Jens Daniel Nowotny (born 11 January 1974) is a German former professional footballer who played as a defender.

He played in nearly 300 official games with Bayer Leverkusen in one full decade, helping them reach the 2002 Champions League final.

Internationally, Nowotny appeared for Germany in one World Cup and two European Championships, gaining 48 caps.

Club career

Karlsruher SC
After playing youth football for two clubs, Nowotny finished his formation with Karlsruher SC. He made his first team – and Bundesliga – on 2 May 1992, playing the entire 1–0 away win against Hamburger SV, and finished the season in the starting eleven, as the club collected three wins in four matches (three goals conceded) and finished in eighth position.

Still not in his 20s, Nowotny became a defensive mainstay for Karlsruhe. On 10 April 1993, he scored a brace for the club in only ten minutes, in a 2–2 draw at VfL Bochum, and went on to collect nearly 150 official appearances during his spell, including four in the 1993–94 UEFA Cup.

Bayer Leverkusen
Aged 22, Nowotny signed for Bayer 04 Leverkusen, making his league debut on 21 August 1996, a 3–1 away success against MSV Duisburg. An undisputed first-choice from the start, he appeared in 32 matches in his first season, as the club finished in second place, trailing FC Bayern Munich by two points; he continued to appear regularly during his stay, often forming an efficient defensive partnership with Carsten Ramelow.

On 30 October 1998, Nowotny scored his first league goal for Leverkusen, in an 8–2 home demolition of Borussia Mönchengladbach. Additionally, he appeared in 16 games in the club's 2001–02 UEFA Champions League runner-up run; however, he was greatly missed in the following season's league campaign, only appearing once as the club finished in 15th position, narrowly escaping relegation, and having the fourth-worse defensive record in the league, at 56 goals conceded.

On 28 September 2004, Nowotny scored his first and only Champions League goal, in Bayer's 2–4 away defeat against FC Dynamo Kyiv. He left the club in the 2006 summer, with more than 300 official appearances - 231 in the Bundesliga - in 10 years.

Dinamo Zagreb
On 18 July 2006, 32-year-old Nowotny agreed to sign a three-year contract with Croatian League champions NK Dinamo Zagreb. He made his debut for Dinamo on 29 July, against NK Slaven Belupo, in the first domestic league match of 2006–07, and also appeared in the club's Champions League qualifying round against Arsenal – the English had tried to sign him in the past – a 0–3 home defeat.

On 19 August 2006, Nowotny suffered an injury during Dinamo's home match against NK Međimurje, a 4–1 win. Even though he was not fully healed and had played all 90 minutes for Germany in a friendly match only three days earlier, he asked to play because his wife and children came to Zagreb to watch him. Coach Josip Kuže, as he later admitted, had his doubts about the player's decision to play; he also had thoughts to substitute him by the end of the match, but changed his mind because of the fans, who had accepted Nowotny with acclamation. After the match, his injury became more serious, and needed surgery, and a one-month layoff (he missed both legs of the side's 2–5 aggregate loss against AJ Auxerre, for the UEFA Cup).

Eventually, on 22 January 2007, Nowotny announced his retirement from football, not being able to fully recover. He said: "To think I may have to wait another 10 months through physiotherapy and returning to training – this is enough.", said the 33-year-old.

International career

Nowotny made his debut for the German national team on 30 April 1997, in a 1998 FIFA World Cup qualifier against Ukraine played in Bremen, replacing striker Fredi Bobic after 15 minutes.

He was subsequently part of the squads at two UEFA European Football Championships, 2000 and 2004, totalling five appearances in two group stage exits; he missed the 2002 World Cup due to a serious injury.

Nowotny was then picked for the 2006 World Cup in his country, after two years of absence from international football. However, the experienced stopper spent the whole tournament as backup to younger Christoph Metzelder and Per Mertesacker, only playing in the third-place play-off against Portugal (3–1 win), as stand-in for the injured Mertesacker. In total he won 48 caps, scoring his only goal in a friendly match, a 7–0 victory over Malta on 27 May 2004.

Career statistics

Club

International

Score and result list Germany's goal tally first, score column indicates score after Nowotny goal.

Honours
Bayer Leverkusen
Bundesliga runner-up: 1996–97, 1998–99, 1999–2000, 2001–02
UEFA Champions League runner-up: 2001–02
DFB-Pokal runner-up: 2001–02

Dinamo Zagreb
Croatian First Football League: 2006–07
Croatian Football Cup: 2006–07

Germany
FIFA World Cup third place: 2006

Individual
kicker Bundesliga Team of the Season: 1998–99, 1999–2000, 2000–01, 2001–02

References

External links

 
 
 
 Leverkusen who's who 

1974 births
Living people
German footballers
Germany under-21 international footballers
Germany international footballers
Association football defenders
Bundesliga players
Karlsruher SC players
Bayer 04 Leverkusen players
Croatian Football League players
GNK Dinamo Zagreb players
UEFA Euro 2000 players
UEFA Euro 2004 players
2006 FIFA World Cup players
German expatriate footballers
Expatriate footballers in Croatia
German expatriate sportspeople in Croatia
Footballers from Karlsruhe
West German footballers